Pseudotajuria is a butterfly genus in the family Lycaenidae. It is monotypic, containing only the species Pseudotajuria donatana. It is found in the Indomalayan realm (Burma - Singapore, Borneo, Sumatra, Banguey, Nias)

References

Eliot, J.N. 1973: The higher classification of the Lycaenidae (Lepidoptera): a tentative arrangement. Bulletin of the British Museum (Natural History), entomology, 28: 371-505

External links

Remelanini
Monotypic butterfly genera
Taxa named by John Nevill Eliot
Lycaenidae genera